Calliostoma mcleani, common name McLean's calliostoma, is a species of sea snail, a marine gastropod mollusk in the family Calliostomatidae.

Description

The shell is approximately 10mm at its aperture.

Distribution
This species occurs in the Pacific Ocean in the shallow subtidal zone off California to Ecuador and off the Galápagos Islands.

References

 Finet, Y., 1995. Marine Molluscs of the Galapagos: Gastropods. A monograph and revision of the families Trochidae, Skeneidae, Turbinidae and Neritidae. First edition ed. L'Informatore Piceno, Italy.

External links
 To Biodiversity Heritage Library (2 publications)
 To ITIS
 To World Register of Marine Species
 

mcleani
Gastropods described in 1964